RV Corvi is an eclipsing binary star system in the southern constellation of Corvus. The brightness of the pair regularly ranges in apparent visual magnitude from 8.6 down to 9.16 over a period 18 hours, even the brightest of which is too faint to be visible to the naked eye. The system is located at a distance of approximately 690 light-years from the Sun based on parallax measurements, and is drifting further away with a radial velocity of ~19 km/s.

The variability of this system was discovered by H. H. Swope. In 1942, Irene G. Buttery published an orbital period of 0.74728 days for the system, showing this is an eclipsing binary. It is a near-contact binary with both stars showing the effect of tidal interactions and the facing sides are less than 10% of the orbital separation apart, but are not in contact. One or both stars may show an excess of luminosity on their facing sides. The system is composed of stars of spectral types F0 and G0, which orbit each other every 0.7473 days.

References

Beta Lyrae variables
Corvus (constellation)
109796
061620
Corvi, RV
F-type main-sequence stars